Gilbert Roland Guevara Perez (December 29, 1959 – July 16, 2008) was a Filipino film-television director from ABS-CBN.

Filmography

TV Director
Maalaala Mo Kaya (3 episodes, 1999–2000)
Tulay (2000) TV episode (series director)
Pulot-Gata (1999) TV episode (series director)
Siato (1999) TV episode (series director)
Arriba, Arriba! (2000)
Berks (2002-2004)
It Might Be You (2003–2004)
Bituing Walang Ningning (2006)
Super Inggo (2006–2007)
Star Magic Presents (1 episode, 2006)
Tender Loving Care (2006) TV episode
Super Inggo 1.5: Ang Bagong Bangis (2007)
Maging Sino Ka Man: Ang Pagbabalik (2007)
Sineserye Presents (2 episodes: 2007-2008)
Patayin sa Sindak si Barbara (2008) TV episode
May Minamahal (2007) TV episode
Kahit Isang Saglit (2008)

Movie Director
Kahit Isang Saglit (2000)
Trip (2001)
Jologs (2002)
Dreamboy (2005)
You Got Me! (2006) 2nd Unit Director
Supahpahpahlicious (2008)

Death
Relatives and friends of movie and television director Gilbert Perez' attended the first night of his wake Thursday night at the Felicidad Room of Arlington Memorial Chapel, 12 G. Araneta Avenue, Quezon City. The night was a star-studded affair as showbiz celebrities whom he worked with through the years dropped by to pay their last respects. Spotted inside the chapel were Shaina Magdayao, Vhong Navarro, Kaye Abad, Michelle Madrigal, Camille Pratts and hunk actor Piolo Pascual. Also present were executives and officials from ABS-CBN. Relatives, friends and colleagues keep on coming to the wake to see 'Manong' Gilbert for the last time. Known to many as 'Manong,' Director Perez or Gilbert Roland Guevara Perez in real life died last Wednesday, July 16 at past 10:00 p.m. at the St. Luke's Medical Center. He was 48. Perez suffered a heart attack last July 1, Tuesday, while directing a scene for ABS-CBN's upcoming television series "A Time for Us" with actor Jericho Rosales and Malaysian actress Carmen Soo. His remains were brought to ABS-CBN on Tuesday, July 22, 2008 for viewing at Studio 1, starting at 5:00 p.m. The final mass was held on July 23, 2008 at 9:00 a.m. in Studio 1.

External links
 

1959 births
2008 deaths
Filipino film directors
Filipino television directors
ABS-CBN people